Meng may refer to:

 Meng (surname) (孟), a Chinese surname
 Master of Engineering (MEng or M.Eng.), an academic or professional master's degree in the field of engineering
 , "M with hook", letter used in the International Phonetic Alphabet
 Labiodental nasal consonantal sound, the sound transcribed by that letter
 Meng (designer), British fashion house
 Marketing Executives Network Group, American non-profit professional association
 Haku (wrestler), a former wrestler who used "Meng" as his stage name in World Championship Wrestling
 Meng (river), in Austria, tributary of the Ill
 Meng and Ecker, British underground comic
 Mueang, pre-modern Tai polities in southwestern China, mainland Southeast Asia, and parts of India, pronounced "Meng" in Chinese